Hother A. Paludan (9 October 1871 – 2 August 1956) was a Danish architect and civil servant.

Biography
Born in Rårup, his parents were the chaplain (later the vicar) Otto Frederik Paludan and Sophie Frederikke Worm. Paludan attended the Technical School in 1891–94. From 1898 until 1904, he studied at the School of Architecture under Hans Jørgen Holm. Paludan was employed by Holm in the refurbishment of estates in Allholm and Vallø in 1894–1902; he was employed by Hack Kampmann in 1902. Paludan received the KA Lars Scholarship in 1902–03 at which time he took a study tour through Europe.

From 1902, Paludan owned a design studio in Copenhagen, moving the business in 1905 to Aalborg, where he stayed until 1932. He taught construction and furniture design at Tech College Aalborg until 1922. During the period of 1933–47, he was again in Copenhagen. From 1932 to 1942, he managed work being done at Amalienborg.

Paludan received many commissions for restoration and rebuilding projects in Jutland churches. He was a member of the Board of Aalborg Historical Museum in 1907–33, Chairman 1929–33. He was made Knight of the Dannebrog in 1929 .

On 10 September 1905 in Valløby, he married Elisabeth Rode (1875-1971). He was the father of the administrator Arvid Paludan (1910-2006). Paludan died in Hellerup in 1956 and is buried in Hellerup Cemetery.

Partial works

Machine housing for waterworks, Blegkilde (1907)
Aalborg Cathedral School, Saxogade (1909–11)
Aalborg Hospital, Hobrovej (1909–11, later extended)
The center building and north wing, Aalborg Hospita, Urbansgade 36 (1912–16, extended)
Housing Aalborg Hospital (1925)
Tuberculosis Hospital, Skovbakkevej (1915)
Aalborg Police Headquarters, Rantzausgade (1917–18)
People's Kitchen, CW Obel Space (1918, now a café)
Archdeacon farm, Queen Christine's Way (1922)
Klostermarksskolen School, ibid (1925)
Ansgar's Church, Vesterbro (1927–29)
St Joseph's Hospital, Kastetvej (1927–29) 
Nordjysk Regional Library, Niels Ebbe's Street (1910, relocation and rebuilding of post office)
Council chamber, Aalborg City Hall (1911)
2 wings, Aalborg Technical College (1911)
Aalborg Savings Bank, Nytorv (1918)
Aalborg Diskontobank (1920–21, demolished)
Administrative building and public housing, Portland Cement and Cement factory Norden, Johannesmindevej (about 1920)
County Hospital, Nibe (1909, extended 1923 by Einar Packness)
Schools in Filskov (1913), in Volstrup (1917), in Guldbæk (1917), in Grindsted by Hammer (1918)
Nørresundby Bank, the Square (1924, with Charles Jensen )
County Hospital, Hobro (extended 1927–28)
Renovation of Lindsborg Castle 
Thyborøn Church (1908)
Sindal Church (1910)
Godthåb Church (1911–12)
Nollund Church (1914)
Jegindø Church (1918–19)
North Vanned Church (1919)
Arden Church (1935)

References

External links

 Hother Paludan 

Danish architects
1871 births
1956 deaths
Burials at Hellerup Cemetery